Thomas Henry Thynne, 5th Marquess of Bath  (15 July 1862 – 9 June 1946), styled Viscount Weymouth until 1896, was a British landowner and Conservative politician. He held ministerial office as Under-Secretary of State for India in 1905 and Master of the Horse between 1922 and 1924. He was also involved in local politics and served as Chairman of Wiltshire County Council between 1906 and his death in 1946.

Background and education
Known from birth by the courtesy title of Viscount Weymouth, he was born at the Stable Yard, St James's, Westminster, the eldest son of John Thynne, 4th Marquess of Bath, by the Honourable Frances Isabella Catherine Vesey, a daughter of Thomas Vesey, 3rd Viscount de Vesci. He was educated at Eton and Balliol College, Oxford, where he graduated BA in 1886, in 1888 promoted by seniority to MA.

Political career
Lord Weymouth sat as Member of Parliament for Frome between 1886 and 1892 and from 1895 to 1896, when he succeeded his father in the marquessate and entered the House of Lords. He served under Arthur Balfour as Under-Secretary of State for India between January and December 1905. He was appointed Lord Lieutenant of Somerset in 1904 and Chairman of Wiltshire County Council in 1906, and held both posts simultaneously until his death in 1946.

Lord Bath was made a Knight of the Garter in 1917. He returned to the government in 1922, when Bonar Law appointed him Master of the Horse. He was sworn of the Privy Council at the same time. He continued in this office until the Conservative government fell in January 1924, the last year under the premiership of Stanley Baldwin.

Lord Bath was also a Lieutenant-Colonel in the Royal Wiltshire Yeomanry and an Honorary Colonel of that regiment and of the 4th Battalion of the Somerset Light Infantry. In 1937 he was appointed Pro-Chancellor of Bristol University.

Family

On 19 April 1890, Lord Bath married Violet Caroline Mordaunt (28 February 1869–29 May 1928), daughter of Harriet, Lady Mordaunt. At the time of Violet's birth her mother had been the wife of Sir Charles Mordaunt, 10th Baronet, but she was said to be the illegitimate daughter of Viscount Cole, who was later co-respondent in a divorce action. They had five children:

Lady Alice Kathleen Violet Thynne (1891–1977), married Lt-Col Oliver Stanley, son of Edward Stanley, 4th Baron Sheffield and had issue.
Lady Emma Margery Thynne (1893–1980), married 1921 (div 1942) William Compton, 6th Marquess of Northampton; no issue.
Second Lieutenant John Alexander Thynne, Viscount Weymouth (1895–1916), killed at Hulluch near Loos in northeastern France while on active service as a 2nd Lieutenant in the Royal Scots Greys. He is buried in the Vermelles British Cemetery.
Lady Mary Beatrice Thynne (1903–1974), married firstly, in 1927, Charles Wilson, 3rd Baron Nunburnholme and had issue, including the 4th and 5th Barons. She married secondly, Ulick Alexander. She was a bridesmaid at the wedding of Prince Albert, Duke of York, and Lady Elizabeth Bowes-Lyon on 26 April 1923.
Henry Frederick Thynne, 6th Marquess of Bath (1905–1992)

The Marchioness of Bath died in May 1928, aged 59. Lord Bath paid for the construction of a village hall at Horningsham, near the family seat at Longleat, as a memorial to her. He remained a widower until his death in June 1946, aged 83. He was succeeded by his second and only surviving son, Henry.

References

External links
 

1862 births
1946 deaths
People educated at Eton College
Alumni of Balliol College, Oxford
Companions of the Order of the Bath
Thynne, Thomas
Councillors in South West England
English justices of the peace
Knights of Justice of the Order of St John
Knights of the Garter
Lord-Lieutenants of Somerset
5
Members of the Privy Council of the United Kingdom
Members of Wiltshire County Council
Royal Wiltshire Yeomanry officers
Somerset County Cricket Club presidents
Thomas
Thynne, Thomas
Thynne, Thomas